Geranylgeraniol 18-hydroxylase (GGOH-18-hydroxylase) is an enzyme with systematic name geranylgeraniol,NADPH:oxygen oxidoreductase (18-hydroxylating). This enzyme catalyses the following chemical reaction

 geranylgeraniol + NADPH + H+ + O2  18-hydroxygeranylgeraniol + NADP+ + H2O

Geranylgeraniol 18-hydroxylase is a heme-thiolate protein (P-450).

References

External links 
 

EC 1.14.13